Wilson Henry Irvine (28 February 1869 – 1936) was a master American Impressionist landscape painter.

Although most closely associated with the Old Lyme, Connecticut art colony headed by Florence Griswold, Irvine spent his early career near Chicago, a product of the School of the Art Institute of Chicago.  Irvine also painted across Western Europe — where he produced outstanding American Impressionist versions of the local countryside.

Early career
Wilson Henry Irvine, born  near Byron, Illinois, was a descendant of early Illinois settlers and farmers.  He graduated from Rockford Central High School. He worked at the Chicago Portrait Company. He studied at The Art Institute of Chicago.

From the beginning, Irvine's interest in painterly subjects was equalled by a parallel focus on artistic technology.  While still in his 20s, Irvine was a pioneer of the airbrush as artistic medium — a medium which had just been developed and marketed by Liberty Walkup, Irvine's Illinois neighbor, mentor, and teacher.

Having mastered the airbrush, in 1888, Irvine moved to Chicago to make his reputation.  Irvine's "day job" during this period was as an illustrator/graphic designer, often employing the still-novel airbrush.  But simultaneously, Irvine built a career as a serious painter.  He worked his way up Chicago art society — he led the Palette and Chisel Club and Cliff Dwellers Club, along with sculptor Lorado Taft.

During these years, Irvine gravitated to the night school of the famed Art Institute of Chicago, where he studied for over seven years.  Indeed, the Art Institute was to remain a loyal patron.  By the turn of the century, the Institute often showed Irvine's work, and gave him a prestigious solo show over the 1916-1917 Christmas season.  To this day, the Art Institute maintains a number of Wilson Irvine paintings in its permanent collection.

Old Lyme, Connecticut years
While developing his career in Chicago, Irvine frequently headed east, painting in Massachusetts, Connecticut, and elsewhere in New England — as early as 1906, he exhibited New England scenes at the Art Institute.  He also took working vacations elsewhere in the Eastern U.S., including to Virginia and New Orleans.

But it was not until he was 45 (in 1914) that Irvine packed up and moved his family to Old Lyme, Connecticut, becoming part of the famed Florence Griswold circle, now recognized as the "American Barbizon," hub of American Impressionism. It is as an Old Lyme painter that Irvine is best remembered today.  (But even after relocating East, Irvine maintained his contacts with Chicago, where the market for his work remained strong.) He corresponded with Sidney C. Woodward.

Following through on his early experiments with the airbrush, in his later years Irvine continued to try out new artistic techniques.  His later work includes "aqua prints" and "prismatic painting." His Prismatic Winter Landscape appeared on the cover of the 31 January 1931 issue of The Literary Digest. In 1926 he was elected into the National Academy of Design as an Associate Academician.

By the end of his career, Irvine was regularly landing solo exhibitions, including at:
 Chicago's Carson Pirie Scott (1922)
 Connecticut's Wadsworth Atheneum (1925)
 New York's Grand Central Art Galleries (1930)

European painting
Irvine's career was highlighted by three extended sojourns to Europe, where he produced some noteworthy examples of American Impressionist European landscapes:
 1908: England and France,
 1923: British Isles,
 1928-29: countrysides around Martigues, France and Ronda, Spain.

Indeed, although Irvine today is best known for his Old Lyme output and is secondarily recognized for his early Illinois landscapes, his European paintings show a special energy, bringing a uniquely American perspective to the vibrant subjects that captivated the French Impressionist masters.

Death and reputation
Wilson Irvine died of a cerebral hemorrhage on 21 August 1936, leaving behind masterful oeuvre.  In recent years, Irvine has been rediscovered and acknowledged as a key figure in early-20th-century American Impressionism.

Today, Wilson Irvine's paintings grace the collection of Chicago's Art Institute, Florence Griswold Museum; National Portrait Gallery, Corcoran Gallery of Art; and Union League Club.

Irvine is best known for his mastery of light and texture — a 1998 exhibit of his work was called Wilson Henry Irvine and the Poetry of Light.  To capture subtle effects of light, Irvine often painted en plein air — wearing his trademark cap, knickers, and goatee, with his easel and his paints set up in the field.

Sometimes Irvine's obsession with light led him to paint rather pedestrian subjects — landscapes depicting little more than some trees, or a road or fence.  But a number of Irvine masterpieces depict well-composed scenes including houses, boats, bridges — even a handful of portraits, including at least one self-portrait and a nude.

References

External links

Irvine, Wilson Henry, 1869-1936, painter. SIRIS
http://americangallery.wordpress.com/category/irvine-wilson-h/

1869 births
1936 deaths
19th-century American painters
American male painters
Artists from Chicago
American Impressionist painters
American landscape painters
School of the Art Institute of Chicago alumni
20th-century American painters
People from Byron, Illinois
19th-century American male artists
20th-century American male artists